Boulevard Hospital was a 234-bed private hospital in Queens, NY.

History
Boulevard was owned by a group of 24 doctors. The hospital lost its payment stream from Medicaid and Medicare 
 and closed. Two years prior they had fired their administrator, who provided authorities with evidence that facilitated investigating alleged improprieties, including "improperly withheld refunds due thousands of patients and used hospital employees for the owners' personal chores."

References

  

Defunct hospitals in Queens
History of Queens, New York